The 1969 Amateur World Series was an international baseball tournament held in Santo Domingo, Dominican Republic from August 15 through August 26, 1969. The competition marked the first time the United States of America sent a team to the Amateur World Series since 1942. Cuba and the US were both 9-0 when they met in the finals, with Cuba winning 2-1. Gaspar Pérez was the winning pitcher for Cuba and also drove in their first run to tie the game and scored the second, decisive run. Most of the 20,000 fans who watched the finals were pro-Cuba, reportedly due to lingering resentment from the 1965 US invasion of the Dominican Republic.

Final standings

References

Baseball World Cup, 1969
Baseball World Cup
1969
Amateur World Series
August 1969 sports events in North America
Sports competitions in Santo Domingo
20th century in Santo Domingo